Fataleka is a Southeast Solomonic language of Malaita.

External links 
 Materials on Fataleka are included in the open access Arthur Capell collections (AC1 and AC2) held by Paradisec.

References

Malaita languages